Maria Anna of Neuburg (28 October 1667 – 16 July 1740), was a German princess and member of the Wittelsbach family, who became Queen consort of Spain in 1689 as the second wife of Charles II, last Habsburg King of Spain.

Her marriage was dominated by the political struggle between French and Austrian factions over the Spanish throne, which resulted in the 1701 to 1714 War of the Spanish Succession. When Charles died in 1700, he was succeeded by the French candidate, Philip V and Maria Anna was exiled. She lived largely forgotten until her death in 1740.

Personal details and marriage

Born in Benrath Palace near Düsseldorf, Maria Anna was the twelfth child of Philip William, then Duke of Berg and Jülich and Elisabeth Amalie of Hesse-Darmstadt. A family reputation for fertility and their Wittelsbach connections made the daughters a popular choice for royal marriages. Of her sisters, Maria Sophia married Peter II of Portugal, and Eleonore became the third wife of Emperor Leopold. Maria Anna was thus aunt to the future emperors Joseph I and Charles VI.

When Philip William succeeded Charles of Simmern as Count of the Palatinate in May 1685, Louis XIV claimed half of it. The French invaded in September 1688 and before withdrawing in 1689, they destroyed much of Heidelberg, plus another 20 substantial towns and numerous villages. Although the policy was applied across the Rhineland, the Palatinate was raided again in 1693, and the devastation shocked much of Europe. 

It confirmed Maria Anna's pro-Austrian, anti-French sentiments, important factors in her selection as the second wife for Charles II of Spain. His first wife, Marie Louise of Orléans died on 12 February 1689; lack of an heir and concerns over his health meant his remarriage became a matter of urgency. His mother and Queen Regent, Mariana of Austria, selected Maria Anna based on her family's history of fertility and their opposition to France. She underwent a proxy marriage to Charles in August 1689, with their formal wedding on 14 May 1690 in San Diego, near Valladolid. Their marriage is commemorated in the Festival book, listing celebrations held in Naples to mark the occasion, the L’ossequio tributario della fedelissima Città di Napoli, per le dimostranze giulive nei Regii Sponsali del Cattolico, ed Invittissimo Monarca Carlo Secondo colla Serenissima Principessa Maria Anna di Neoburgo Palatina del Reno.

Queen of Spain

The Spanish political establishment was split into pro-Austrian and pro-French factions, the latter led by Fernández de Portocarrero, Cardinal and Archbishop of Toledo. For most of this period, the 'Austrians' controlled government, with Maria Anna assuming leadership after Mariana of Austria died in 1696. In 1690, they supported Spain's entry into the Nine Years War, which proved a disastrous decision; the state declared bankruptcy in 1692 and by 1696, France occupied most of Catalonia. 

Maria Anna's power derived from her status as mother of the future monarch, which dissipated when it became clear this was unlikely to occur. By now, Charles was almost certainly impotent, his autopsy later revealing he had only one atrophied testicle. To offset this, she claimed to be pregnant on various occasions, and encouraged Charles to undergo treatments to increase his fertility, thus making it clear the failure to produce an heir was not her fault.

In 1698, Charles fell seriously ill and his death seemed imminent. On 11 October, Britain, France and the Dutch Republic signed the Treaty of the Hague or First Partition Treaty, an attempt to impose a solution to the Succession issue on Spain and Austria. Six year old Joseph Ferdinand of Bavaria, was made heir to the bulk of the Spanish Empire, the rest split between France and Austria. His parents were Charles's niece Maria Antonia and Maximilian of Bavaria, a Wittelsbach like Maria Anna. The Spanish were not consulted on the partition of their Empire and unsurprisingly opposed such a solution. On 14 November 1698, Charles published his Will, naming Joseph Ferdinand his successor but stipulating he would inherit an undivided Spanish Monarchy. It also appointed Maria Anna regent during his minority, an announcement reportedly received by his Spanish councillors in silence.

After Joseph Ferdinand died from smallpox in 1699, France, Britain and the Dutch Republic agreed to the Second Partition Treaty in March 1700. Joseph Ferdinand was replaced by Maria Anna's nephew, Archduke Charles, with Spanish possessions in Italy, the Netherlands and Northern Spain divided between France, Savoy and Austria. Charles modified his Will in favour of Archduke Charles, but continued to insist on an undivided Monarchy and added the requirement Spain remain independent of Austria. 

Most of the Castilian nobility preferred a Bourbon candidate, despite efforts by Maria Anna to ensure her nephew's succession. In June 1700, her ally Mendoza, Inquisitor General, arrested Charles's pro-French personal confessor Froilán Díaz, and charged him with 'bewitching' the king. When the committee set up to review the case acquitted Díaz, Mendoza ordered their arrest, seriously undermining Maria Anna, who was viewed as the instigator. A Council was established to investigate the Inquisition itself; it survived as an institution until 1834, but its power was broken. 

Charles fell ill once again in late 1700 and by 28 September he was no longer able to eat and Portocarrero persuaded him to alter his Will in favour of Louis XIV's grandson, Philip of Anjou. His death on 1 November was followed by Philip's proclamation as King of Spain on 16th, with Portocarrero as his chief advisor. Maria Anna was exiled to Toledo, where she lived quietly until 1706, when the forces of her nephew Archduke Charles briefly occupied the city. Philip later exiled her to Bayonne in France, where she lived for the next few decades and allegedly married a local barrel-maker. In 1739, she was allowed to return to Spain, and given lodging in the Palacio del Infantado, Guadalajara. She died on 16 July 1740, and was buried in El Escorial Monastery.

Heraldry

Ancestry

References

Sources
 
 
 
 
 * 
 
 
 
 
 
 
 
 
 
 

1667 births
1740 deaths
Royal consorts of Naples
Royal consorts of Sicily
Spanish royal consorts
Countesses Palatine of Neuburg
House of Wittelsbach
Nobility from Düsseldorf
People from Berg (state)
Burials in the Pantheon of Infantes at El Escorial
Daughters of monarchs